The canton of Saint-Étienne-1 is an administrative division of the Loire department, in eastern France. It was created at the French canton reorganisation which came into effect in March 2015. Its seat is in Saint-Étienne.

It consists of the following communes: 
Saint-Étienne (partly)

References

Cantons of Loire (department)